Yusuf Çim  (born 26 September 1991) is a Turkish actor, singer, TV presenter and model.

Career

Modelling career 
Both before and after the 2011 Best Model of Turkey competition Çim appeared in many fashion shows. He has appeared on fashion shows such as Fashion Week, Günsel Ülkü, Forever Young and walked on the podium for well-known brands like Damat, Kiğili, Tween, Ralph Lauren, Hatemoğlu, Polo, Mango, Marks & Spencer.

Music career 
His music career began in August 2013 with his EP album Olsun Bi Kere. The album features 4 different versions of the same song.

Acting career 
Çim started his music career by signing a contract with Leo Medya Production. His first role was on the TV series Ezra, written and directed by Tayfun Güneyer, in which he played the role of Superintendent Mustafa. The series premiered in December 2014 on Show TV. He then appeared in 
Gold Production's 2015 series Çilek Kokusu opposite Demet Özdemir and portrayed the character of "Burak Mazharoğlu". In 2016, he starred in another series produced by Gold Production, titled Hanım Köylü, and played opposite Gülsim İlhan Ali.

Television career 
Çim started his career as a TV presenter with the program Piramit, which was produced by C Production and aired on Show TV in 2015. He was the main presenter of the competition program in which Evrim Akın and Gökhan Yıkılkan were the main coaches.
He also presented Show TV's special 2016 New Year program, 'Sibel Can ile Yılbaşı Özel'.

Other ventures 
 Aside from his professional life, Çim has taken part in a number of charitable activities. With the help of the Down Syndrome Association, he created a project titled "Don't Forget This Year!" t help children suffering from Down Syndrome.
 In 2016, Çim became the advertising face of the Loft brand, and had previously been included in the catalog shoot of the same brand.

Filmography 
Film

Television

Discography

References

External links 
 
 
 

1991 births
Turkish male models
Turkish pop singers
Turkish male television actors
Living people
21st-century Turkish singers
21st-century Turkish male singers
Turkish lyricists